Puthagaram is a village in Tamil Nadu, India.  Here ancient Sri Maha kaliamman Temple is located.

Demographics 
As per the 2001 census, Puthagaram had a total population of 1713 with 879 males and 834 females. The sex ratio was 949. The literacy rate was 70.68.
Significant section of the population belongs to the Senguntha Mudaliyar's.
There celebrate Sri Maha Kaliamman thiruviza ever year second week. This is part of Mudaliar community Festival, all other community people also doing active participation.

References

Sources 

Villages in Mayiladuthurai district